The Women's FITA round open was one of the events held in archery at the 1960 Summer Paralympics in Rome.

There were only three competitors - representing Great Britain and Rhodesia. Rhodesia's Margaret Harriman scored 962 points to win gold with a crushing lead over her two British opponents.

References 

W
Para